Hann. Münden (short for Hannoversch Münden) is a town in Lower Saxony, Germany. Münden lies in the district of Göttingen at the confluence of the Fulda and Werra rivers, which join to form the Weser. It has about 24,000 inhabitants (2013). It is famous for its half-timbered houses, some of them more than 600 years old.

History

The place is first mentioned in the deeds of donation of Gimundi to the abbey of Fulda, in 802. The town's name means "confluence" in old German; the prefix Hannoversch, or "Hanoverian", was added in the 19th century to help distinguish the town from its similarly-named Prussian neighbour, Minden.

City rights might have been granted during the latter half of the 12th century.

The French inventor Denis Papin built a steam-pump-powered paddlewheel boat, probably pedal-driven in 1704, and as a demonstration used it to navigate down the Fulda River from Kassel to Münden in 1707.

Hann. Münden was the site of the Royal Prussian Academy of Forestry: the city's botanical gardens with many different trees were primarily established for this academy. Later the academy was merged into the University of Göttingen, moving to a new building on the main campus in 1970.

Main sights
Many tourists visit the city to see its some 700 well-preserved half-timbered medieval houses.

The large Lutheran church of St Blasius (14th–15th centuries), in Gothic style, contains the sarcophagus of Duke Eric I of Brunswick-Calenberg (d. 1540).

Other sights include:
 Renaissance Town Hall, built in the 14th century (now the central Gothic hall remains) with a façade renewed between 1603 and 1618.
 Old Werrabrücke, the bridge over the Werra river: one of the oldest stone bridges in the country
 Forstbotanischer Garten in Hannoversch Münden, an arboretum
 Remains of the medieval 12th century city walls (renewed in the 15th century)
 Tillyschanze, an observation tower built from 1881 to 1885 by citizens of the town in memory of the siege of the town by Count Tilly in 1626.
 Welfenschloss, originally built by Duke Eric I in the Gothic style in 1501, as both a residence and administrative center. After its destruction by a fire in 1560, Duke Eric II had it rebuilt in Weser Renaissance style. The southern wing was again destroyed by a fire in 1849, but not rebuilt.

Notable people

Anna Marie of Brunswick-Lüneburg (1532–1568), duchess of Brunswick-Lüneburg
Ludolph Büsinck (1600–1669), wood-engraver, customs administrator of the city of Hann. Münden
Johann Andreas Eisenbarth (1663–1727), surgeon and eye surgeon
Hermann Friedrich Teichmeyer (1685–1746), forensics physician
Christian Kalkbrenner (1755–1806), Kapellmeister
Eduard Huschke (1801–1886), jurist
Ferdinand Wüstenfeld (1808–1899), orientalist
Heinrich Christian Burckhardt (1811–1879), forest scientist and from 1844 to 1849 first teacher of the forest school Münden; Honorary citizen of Hann. Münden
Ernst Wollweber (1898–1967), politician SED, Minister for State Security of the GDR
Gustav Eberlein (1847–1926), sculptor, lived and worked here
Anne-Marie von Schutzbar genannt Milchling (1903–1991), second wife of Nikolaus, Hereditary Grand Duke of Oldenburg
Christa Schroeder (1908–1984), personal secretary to Adolf Hitler
Adam von Trott zu Solz (1909–1944), diplomat, resistance fighter during the Nazi period, studied here 1922–1927
Hanne Wieder (1925–1990), cabaret artist, actress, singer
Niclas Huschenbeth (born 1992), chess grandmaster

Twin towns – sister cities

Hann. Münden is twinned with:
 Suresnes, France (1959)

 Holon, Israel (1988)
 Chełmno, Poland (1992)

See also
 Hedemünden
 Metropolitan region Hannover-Braunschweig-Göttingen-Wolfsburg

References

Attribution

External links

 Official city homepage
 Official tourist office of Hann. Münden

Göttingen (district)
Members of the Hanseatic League